The Malaysian Chess Championship is organized by the Malaysian Chess Federation (MCF). Known as the National Closed Chess Championship prior to 2016, the first edition was held in 1974. A separate Malaysian Women's Chess Championship has also been held annually since 1990. FIDE Master Christi Hon has won the national title a record five times, while Woman International Master Siti Zulaikha Foudzi has won the women's title a record eight times. Curiously, it has occurred twice that a pair of siblings have won the national and the women's titles in the same year: Kamal Ariffin Wahiddudin and Nurul Huda Wahiduddin in 1991, and Zarul Shazwan Zullkafli and Nur Shazwani Zullkafli in 2007.

National championship winners

{| class="sortable wikitable"
! Year !! Champion
|-
| 1974 || Choo Min Wang
|-
| 1975 || Chan Swee Loon
|-
| 1976 || Goh Yoon Wah
|-
| 1977 || Tan Bian Huat
|-
| 1978 || Christi Hon
|-
| 1979 || Tay Chong Thai
|-
| 1980 || Jimmy Liew
|-
| 1981 || Christi Hon, Goh Yoon Wah
|-
| 1982 || Christi Hon
|-
| 1983 || Christi Hon
|-
| 1984 || Jimmy Liew
|-
| 1985 || Peter Long, Francis Chin
|-
| 1986 || Peter Long, Francis Chin
|-
| 1987 || Christi Hon, Lee Soi Hock
|-
| 1988 || Kamal Abdullah
|-
| 1989 || Kamal Abdullah
|-
| 1990 || Ng Ek Leong
|-
| 1991 || Kamal Ariffin Wahiddudin
|-
| 1992 || Mok Tze Meng
|- 
| 1993 || Yeoh Chin Seng
|-
| 1994 || Mas Hafizulhelmi
|- 
| 1995 || Mas Hafizulhelmi
|-
| 1996 || Lim Yee Weng
|-
| 1997 || Lim Yee Weng
|- 
| 1998 || Ng Ee Vern
|-
| 1999 || Jonathan Chuah
|-
| 2000 || Ng Tze Han
|-
| 2001 || Lim Chuin Hoong (Ronnie Lim)
|-
| 2002 || Wong Zi Jing
|-
| 2003 || Nicholas Chan
|-
| 2004 || Nicholas Chan
|-
| 2005 || Marcus Chan
|-
| 2006 || Jonathan Chuah
|-
| 2007 || Zarul Shazwan Zullkafli
|-
| 2008 || Lee Kim Han (Edward Lee)
|-
| 2009 || Evan Timothy Capel
|-
| 2010 || Tan Khai Boon
|-
| 2011 || Lim Zhuo Ren
|-
| 2012 ||Roshan Ajeet Singh
|-
| 2013 ||Aron Teh
|-
| 2014 ||Fong Yit San
|-
| 2015 || Yeoh Li Tian
|- 
| 2016 || Yeoh Li Tian
|-
| 2017 || Wong Yinn Long
|-
| 2018 || Fong Yit San
|-
| 2019 || Kamal Abdullah
|-
| 2022 || Tan Jun Ying
|}

Women's championship winners
{| class="sortable wikitable"
! Year !! Champion
|-
| 1990 ||Audrey Wong
|-
| 1991 ||Nurul Huda Wahiduddin
|-
| 1992 ||Nurul Huda Wahiduddin
|- 
| 1993 ||Eliza Hanum Ibrahim
|-
| 1994 ||Roslina Marmono
|- 
| 1995 ||Khairunnisa Wahiduddin
|-
| 1996 ||Eliza Hanum Ibrahim
|-
| 1997 ||Eliza Hanim Ibrahim
|- 
| 1998 ||Eliza Hanum Ibrahim
|-
| 1999 ||Siti Zulaikha Foudzi
|-
| 2000 ||Siti Zulaikha Foudzi
|-
| 2001 ||Siti Zulaikha Foudzi
|-
| 2002 ||Siti Zulaikha Foudzi
|-
| 2003 ||Siti Zulaikha Foudzi
|-
| 2004 ||Siti Zulaikha Foudzi
|-
| 2005 ||Siti Zulaikha Foudzi
|-
| 2006 ||Siti Zulaikha Foudzi
|-
| 2007 ||Nur Shazwani Zullkafli
|-
| 2008 ||Alia Anin Azwa Bakri
|-
| 2009 ||Tan Li Ting
|-
| 2010 ||Fong Mi Yen
|-
| 2011 ||Nur Nabila Azman Hisham
|-
| 2012 ||Nur Najiha Azman Hisham
|-
| 2013 ||Nur Nabila Azman Hisham
|-
| 2014 ||Renitha Narayanan
|-
| 2015 ||Nur Nabila Azman Hisham
|- 
| 2016 ||Tan Li Ting
|-
| 2017 ||Nur Nabila Azman Hisham
|- 
| 2018 ||Tan Li Ting
|-
| 2019 ||Puteri Munajjah Az-Zahraa Azhar
|-
| 2022 ||Siti Zulaikha Foudzi
|}

Precursors

Malayan championship
Prior to the formation of Malaysia, a Malayan Chess Championship was organized by the Malayan Chess Federation which was founded in 1949. It was usually hosted in Singapore and was open to players outside the Federation of Malaya. The first winner, was a Dutchman from Java.

Malayan championship winners
{| class="sortable wikitable"
! Year !! Location !! Champion

|-
| 1949 || Penang || 
|-
| 1950 || Singapore || Pat Aherne
|-
| 1951 || Singapore || J. C. Hickey
|-
| 1952 || Singapore || G. H. Brownbill
|-
| 1953 || Singapore || Tay Kheng Hong
|-
| 1954 || Singapore || Richard Lim
|-
| 1955 || Kuala Lumpur || David B. Pritchard
|-
| 1956 || Singapore || M. Davis
|-
| 1957 || Singapore || J. C. Hickey
|-
| 1958 || Singapore || J. C. Hickey
|-
| 1959 || Singapore || J. C. Hickey
|-
| 1960 || Singapore || R. E. Fontana
|-
| 1961 || Kuala Lumpur || Tan Lian Ann
|-
| 1962 || Singapore || Tan Lian Ann
|-
| 1963 || Singapore || Tan Lian Seng
|}

Malaysian championships prior to 1974
In April 1965, the Singapore Chess Federation and the Chess Association of Malaya hosted "the first Malaysian chess championship" in Singapore, which was open to "people in all Malaysian States." The winner was Tan Lian Ann of Singapore. Afterwards, national championships in Malaysia were held irregularly due to a lack of organizers. Before the Malaysian Chess Federation replaced the Chess Association of Malaya, the last national tournament took place in 1972–1973 in Kuala Lumpur and was won by Chan Mun Fye.

References

Chess in Malaysia
Chess national championships
Women's chess national championships
Chess
Recurring sporting events established in 1949
Recurring sporting events disestablished in 1963
Recurring sporting events established in 1974
Recurring sporting events established in 1990
Chess
Chess
Chess
Chess
1949 in chess
1963 in chess
1974 in chess
1990 in chess